is a passenger railway station in the city of Naruto, Tokushima Prefecture, Japan. It is operated by JR Shikoku and has the station number "N05".

Lines
Only local services stop at the station.

Layout
The station, which is unstaffed, consists of a side platform serving a single track. There is no station building, only a shelter on the platform. A ramp leads up to the platform from the access road.

History
Japanese National Railways (JNR) opened the station on 15 April 1961 as an added station on the existing Naruto Line. With the privatization of JNR on 1 April 1987, control of the station passed to JR Shikoku.

Passenger statistics
In fiscal 2019, the station was used by an average of 84 passengers daily

Surrounding area
 Ōtani ware kilns
Horiekita Elementary School, Naruto City
Emperor Tsuchimikado cremation spot

See also
 List of Railway Stations in Japan

References

External links

 JR Shikoku timetable

Railway stations in Tokushima Prefecture
Railway stations in Japan opened in 1961
Naruto, Tokushima